is a Japanese manga series written and illustrated by yoruhashi. It began serialization in Mag Garden's Monthly Comic Garden magazine in April 2019. An anime television series adaptation by Yokohama Animation Laboratory will premiere in October 2023.

Characters

Media

Manga
Written and illustrated by yoruhashi, The Kingdoms of Ruin began serialization Mag Garden's shōnen manga magazine Monthly Comic Garden on April 5, 2019. It is also serialized on the Manga Doa, Mag Comi, pixiv Comic websites. As of March 2023, eight tankōbon volumes have been released. In April 2020, Seven Seas Entertainment announced that they had licensed the series for English publication.

Anime
An anime television series adaptation was announced on February 1, 2023. The series is produced by Yokohama Animation Laboratory and directed by Keitaro Motonaga, with Takamitsu Kono in charge of series composition, Hiromi Kato designing the characters, and Miki Sakurai, Shu Kanematsu, and Hanae Nakamura composing the music. It is set to premiere in October 2023.

References

External links
 
 

Anime and manga about revenge
Anime series based on manga
Dark fantasy anime and manga
Mag Garden manga
Science fantasy anime and manga
Seven Seas Entertainment titles
Shōnen manga
Upcoming anime television series
Witchcraft in anime and manga
Yokohama Animation Laboratory